Wayne Clark may refer to:

 Wayne Clark (cricketer) (born 1953), former Australian cricketer
 Wayne Clark (American football) (born 1947), former American football quarterback

See also
 Wayne Clarke (disambiguation)